Loti is town and union council of Dera Bugti District in the Balochistan province of Pakistan. It is located at 28°56'60N 69°24'0E, and has an altitude of 466 metres (1532 feet), the area is rich in natural resources.

References

Populated places in Dera Bugti District
Union councils of Balochistan, Pakistan